Griffin Neame (born 1 March 2001) is a New Zealand professional rugby league footballer who plays as a  for the North Queensland Cowboys in the NRL.

Background 
Neame was born in Greymouth, New Zealand.

He played his junior rugby league for Suburbs RL Club Greymouth and attended Greymouth High School before being signed by the North Queensland Cowboys.

Playing career

Early career
In 2017, Neame represented the New Zealand Residents under-16 side against the NZ Māori under-17 team.

In 2019, Neame played for the Townsville Blackhawks in the Mal Meninga Cup and Hastings Deering Colts competitions. In September 2019, he represented the Junior Kiwis.

On 7 October 2020, Neame joined North Queensland's NRL squad on a development contract for the 2021 season.

2021
Neame began the 2021 season playing for the Blackhawks in the Queensland Cup. On 12 May, Neame re-signed with the North Queensland club until the end of the 2023 season.
In Round 22 of the 2021 NRL season, Neame made his NRL debut against the Wests Tigers.

2022
Neame played 23 matches for North Queensland in the 2022 NRL season as the club finished third on the table and qualified for the finals.  Neame played in both finals matches including their preliminary final loss to Parramatta.

References

External links 
North Queensland Cowboys profile

2001 births
New Zealand rugby league players
North Queensland Cowboys players
Townsville Blackhawks players
Junior Kiwis players
Rugby league locks
Rugby league props
Living people
People educated at Greymouth High School